Liechtenstein competed at the 2011 World Aquatics Championships in Shanghai, China between July 16 and 31, 2011.

Swimming

Liechtenstein qualified 1 swimmer.

Women

References

Nations at the 2011 World Aquatics Championships
2011 in Liechtenstein sport
Liechtenstein at the World Aquatics Championships